Mount Mills is a mountain,  high, forming part of the north escarpment of the Dominion Range in Antarctica, overlooking Beardmore Glacier  north of Mount Saunders. It was discovered by the British Antarctic Expedition (1907–09) and named for Sir James Mills who, with the government of New Zealand, paid the cost of towing the expedition ship Nimrod to Antarctica in 1908.

References

Mountains of the Ross Dependency
Dufek Coast